Montefiore Conca is a comune (municipality) in the Province of Rimini in the Italian region Emilia-Romagna, located about  southeast of Bologna and about  south of Rimini.   

Montefiore Conca borders the following municipalities: Gemmano, Mondaino, Morciano di Romagna, Saludecio, San Clemente, Sassocorvaro Auditore, Tavoleto.

References

Cities and towns in Emilia-Romagna